Pseudamnicola pieperi is a species of very small freshwater snail with an operculum, an aquatic gastropod mollusc in the family Hydrobiidae.

Geographic distribution 
P. pieperi is endemic to Greece, where it occurs on the island of Carpathos. The species was originally known only from its type locality, a spring near the village of Aperi; however, in 2012 it was found at seven new localities, a fact which might indicate that its conservation status needs to be updated.

References

External links

Hydrobiidae
Gastropods of Europe
Endemic fauna of Greece
Gastropods described in 1980